Gerard Madden is a native of Whitegate, County Clare, and is the author of a number of books dealing with the ancestry of Irish families, including the Maddens of County Galway.

References
Holy Island, Jewel of the Lough, 1990, reprinted 1996, 2004, 2016 
For God or King, The History of Mountshannon, 1742 - 1992 (1993) reprinted 1997 
The Famine Memorial Park, Tuamgraney (1997)
A History of Scariff and Tuamgraney since earliest times (2000)
History of the O'Maddens of Hy Many (2004) 
History of the O'Gradys of Clare and Limerick (2007)
Holy Island, Island of the Churches (2008)
Sliabh Aughty Ramble. Musings on the folklore, history, landscape and literature of the Sliabh Aughty region(2010)
The Old Road. The Writings of Nora T. Goonane Leonard 1913-2007.(2011)  
Portraits of Mountshannon (2012)
Lough Derg and its Islands with accompanying maps. A voyage of discovery by road and by water(2016)
The Annals of the Poor. Scariff Workhouse Union counties Clare & Galway 1839-1851(2017)
Editor 16 editions of Sliabh Aughty Journal 1991-2016 ISSN 0791-4571

People from County Clare
Living people
Year of birth missing (living people)
Irish writers